Pärnu is a city in Estonia.

Parnu or Pärnu may also refer to:
 Pärnu County, a first-level administrative subdivision of Estonia
 Pärnu (urban municipality), a subdivision of Parnu County
 Pärnu (river), a river in Estonia
 Ghodiyu, a type of cradle known in South India as "parnu"